Kill or Cure is a 1962 British comedy film directed by George Pollock and starring Terry-Thomas and Eric Sykes.

Plot
Mr Barker Rynde comes to a country hotel to assist a wealthy widow. He endures a nature cure diet and exercises under Rumbelow. When the widow is poisoned, Barker Rynde and Rumbelow join forces to win a reward offered by the hotel manager Crossley. Crossley is next murdered but this leads to the original criminal. The reward however has been inherited by the widow's Pekinese.

Cast
 Terry-Thomas as Capt. J. (Jeroboam) Barker-Rynde PI
 Eric Sykes as Rumbelow
 Dennis Price as Dr. Julian Crossley
 Lionel Jeffries as Det. Insp. Hook
 Moira Redmond as Francis Roitman, Clifford's Secretary
 Katya Douglas as Rita - Green Glades Nurse
 David Lodge as Richards - Male Nurse
 Ronnie Barker as Burton - Hook's Assistant
 Hazel Terry as Mrs. Rachel Crossley
 Derren Nesbitt as Roger Forrester (as Derrin Nesbitt)
 Harry Locke as Riggins
 Arthur Howard as Johnson - Green Glades Desk Clerk
 Tristram Jellinek as Asst. Clerk
 Peter Butterworth as Green Glades Barman
 Patricia Hayes as Lily the Waitress
 Anna Russell as Mrs. Margaret Clifford
 Mandy as Horatio 
 Sidney Vivian as Fred - Barber-Rynde's Assistant (as Sidney Vyvyan)
 Julian Orchard as P.C. Lofthouse

Reception
According to MGM records the film made a profit of $89,000.

See also
 List of British films of 1962

References

External links
 
 
 

1962 films
Films directed by George Pollock
1962 comedy films
British comedy films
Metro-Goldwyn-Mayer films
Films scored by Ron Goodwin
1960s English-language films
1960s British films